Donald W. Colpoys (June 19, 1934 – March 29, 2018) was an American baseball coach and executive. Colpoys was the head baseball coach at Canisius College from 1977 to 2001, compiling an overall record of 325–489–2. He also served as general manager of the Buffalo Bisons from 1979 to 1984. Colpoys was elected to the Buffalo Baseball Hall of Fame in 2007, the Greater Buffalo Sports Hall of Fame in 2011, and the Canisius College Sports Hall of Fame in 2012. Colpoys died on March 29, 2018, at the age of 83.

Head coaching record

References

External links

1934 births
2018 deaths
Baseball players from New York (state)
Sportspeople from Buffalo, New York
Canisius Golden Griffins baseball coaches
Buffalo Bisons (minor league)